The Nokia C2-00 is a mobile telephone handset produced by Nokia. It is the first mobile handset released by Nokia that supports dual SIM functionality. It was announced in June 2010 and was first released in July 2011, over a year after its announcement.

In February 2020, HMD Global unveiled an Android Go smartphone with almost same name, Nokia C2

Features 
The key feature of this phone is Dual SIM. It means that the phone can have two SIM cards of which the second is hot swappable (i.e. can be changed without restarting the phone). Other features include: VGA camera, Bluetooth 2.1 + EDR, Flash Lite 4.0 and MIDP Java 4.5 with additional Java APIs.

Specification sheet

References

External links
 Nokia C2-00 Device specification at Nokia Developer
 Overview at Nokia - Singapore webpage

Mobile phones introduced in 2011
C2-00
Mobile phones with user-replaceable battery